Daniel Joseph Burmeister (born September 13, 1963) is a former American football safety in the National Football League for the Washington Redskins.  He played college football at the University of North Carolina.  In 1982, he was named a Parade High School Football All-American while playing for Oakton High School in Fairfax County, Virginia.

References 

1963 births
Living people
American football safeties
North Carolina Tar Heels football players
Washington Redskins players
National Football League replacement players
Oakton High School alumni